The Church of Our Lady is an Evangelical Protestant church situated northwest of the Market Square in Bremen, Germany. Like Bremen Cathedral, today's building dates from the 13th century. The brightly coloured stained-glass windows are the work of the French artist Alfred Manessier. In 1973, the church was listed under the monument protection act.

History and architecture
The church was originally dedicated to Saint Vitus. It served as market church of the city and later also as church of the city council. Around 1020, a new building was erected of which only the crypt still exists, decorated with medieval frescos. The church was extended to form a basilica in the middle of the 12th century. Around 1220, it was consecrated to the Virgin Mary. From 1230 onwards, it was rebuilt in the early Gothic style as a hall church. A westwork with two towers was added. For many years, the northern tower contained the archive of the city council of Bremen, known as the Tresekammer. In the 14th century, the choir was extended.

Interior

The interior was damaged by fire in 1944, but much less than the other medieval churches of the city. When the new organ was installed in 1953, the acoustics were so poor that in 1958 the city assigned Dieter Oesterlen to manage the church's refurbishment. The residual medieval plastering and the remains of the frescos were removed, leaving plain brick walls. In 1966, the French artist Alfred Manessier was charged with redesigning the 19 windows that had been destroyed during the Second World War. Inspired by verses from the Bible, he embarked first on the design of the four main windows, employing brightly coloured stained glass representations with expressive linear patterns. Together they depict various manifestations of the Word of God. At the end of the aisle to the north of the altar, the Christmas Window is inspired by "The Word became flesh" (John 1:14), while the Pentecost Window at the east end of the chancel is inspired by the Miracle of Tongues (Acts 2). The Sermon Window symbolises the preached word: "We are ambassadors for Christ" (2 Corinthians 5:20) while the Virgin Mary Window, a rose window at the opposite end of the church draws on the Christmas story: "Mary kept all these sayings, pondering them in her heart" (Luke 2:19). With the assistance of François Lorin from Chartres, Manessier completed his work in 1979.

Name
Since 1220, the church has been named after Mary, the mother of Jesus Christ. This name (Church of Our Lady) has been used by more than 250 churches in the world and by more than 150 religious orders or convents in Germany.

In Bremen, the name is widely used:
 the space around the church is named Unser-Lieben-Frauen-Kirchhof
 there used to be a cellar, northwest of the church, named Liebfrauenkeller, which was used as a restaurant between 1948 and 2002 (ice cream parlour, confectionery Schnuchel, restaurant Liebfrauenkeller, Disco New Yorker.
 There used to be a school named Liebfrauenschule which was taken over by the city in 1901 and subsequently abandoned and knocked down. The school was situated in the second aisle of the church and extended into an annexe at the western side of the church.
 The Liebfrauen-Restaurant, between 1871 and 1891 at the northwest corner of the Liebfrauen-churchyard. When the so-called 18th century Bickhaus was knocked down, the restaurant moved to the corner of Sögestrasse and Queerenstrasse. It was destroyed by bombing in 1944.

Dimensions
The Liebfrauenkirche has two steeples.

Sculptures
The flour of the church comprises some medieval tombstones, but there are no medieval sculptures, if there had been any, they have been removed during the reformation. But there are two sculptures from the 19th century.

Moltke-monument at the north tower

The equestrian sculpture on the wall of the southern steeple was placed there in 1909. It shows the Prussian field marshal Helmut Graf von Moltke and was donated by the banker Bernhard Loose from Bremen, who already died on 31 March 1902. It was designed by Heinrich Jennen from Berlin-Charlottenburg and sculpted by Hermann Hahn of Munich. Like the sculpture itself, the inscription above it expresses the militarism of the period:"He who armed and protected you
consider this, when you approach him:
Peace has to be supported by the sword
if you remain silent, the evil deed will grow."

War memorial 
After World War I, the architect Otto Blendermann from Bremen and the sculptor Friedrich Lommel from Munich created a war memorial in honour of the dead soldiers of Bremen garrison. In 2011, it was converted into a memorial for all victims of all wars. Since then, panes of opalescent glass on the walls bear a biblical admonition to keep peace, and panes of opalescent glass hiding the sculpture bear the names of the soldiers.

Organ
The organ was built in 1953 by Paul Ott (Göttingen). At the time, the steeple bay had been bricked up. As a result, the organ was situated on the west wall of the bay. In 1964, it was reinstalled in a new casing on the south aisle's west wall. The last readjustment took place in 1984 by the organ builder Karl Schuke in Berlin. At that time, the disposition was slightly changed.

Bells
The church has only one bell in the south tower, cast in the 13th or 14th century. Apart from that, there is only a clock bell.

Further information
Services are held in the Liebfrauenkirche on Sundays and religious holidays at 10:30 am. Founded 1945 by the cantor Harald Wolf, the boys' choir is recognized throughout the region.

References

External links 

  
 History of the church building and the organs 

Churches in Bremen (city)
Bremen
Protestant churches in Bremen (state)